O'Connor or O'Conor may refer to:

People
 O'Connor or O'Conor, an Irish clan
 O'Connor Sligo, a royal dynasty ruling the northern part of the Kingdom of Connacht
 O'Connor (surname), including a list of people with the surname

Places
Burnet O'Connor Province, a province in the Tarija Department in Bolivia
Division of O'Connor, a Western Australian electoral district in the Australian House of Representatives
O'Connor, Australian Capital Territory
O'Connor Island, Windmill Islands, Antarctica
O'Connor, Nebraska, U.S.
O'Connor, Ontario, Canada
O'Connor, Western Australia, suburb of Perth
Port O'Connor, Texas, U.S.

Other
O'Connor Airlines, a former South Australian airline
O'Connor Drive, Toronto, Canada
O'Connor v. Donaldson, a 1975 U.S. Supreme Court decision on the rights of mental health patients
O'Connor v. Ortega, a 1987 U.S. Supreme Court decision on the privacy rights of government employees at work
Sandra Day O'Connor High School (Arizona), Glendale, Arizona, U.S.
Sandra Day O'Connor High School (Helotes, Texas), U.S.
Senator O'Connor College School, Toronto, Canada

See also
O'Conner, variant form of the surname